The 2020–21 Perth Scorchers Women's season was the sixth in the team's history. Coached by Shelley Nitschke and captained by Sophie Devine, the Scorchers played the entirety of WBBL06 in a bio-secure Sydney hub due to the COVID-19 pandemic and, for the second year in a row, were eliminated in the semi-finals. In her first season with the Scorchers, Devine was named the league-wide Player of the Tournament, earning the same award that she won in WBBL05 while playing for the Adelaide Strikers.

Squad 
Each 2020–21 squad is to be made up of 15 active players. Teams can sign up to five 'marquee players', with a maximum of three of those from overseas. Marquees are classed as any overseas player, or a local player who holds a Cricket Australia national contract at the start of the WBBL|06 signing period.

Personnel changes made ahead of the season included:

 Shelley Nitschke was appointed head coach of the Scorchers, replacing Lisa Keightley who departed to take on the role as coach of England.
 Meg Lanning departed the Scorchers after three seasons, returning to the Melbourne Stars where she played the first two WBBL seasons.
 Beth Mooney signed a two-year contract with the Scorchers, departing the Brisbane Heat.
 New Zealand marquee Sophie Devine signed with the Scorchers, having played the five previous seasons with the Adelaide Strikers. Devine was also announced as the team's new captain.
 Georgia Redmayne departed the Scorchers, signing with the Brisbane Heat.
 England marquee Nat Sciver departed the Scorchers, returning to the Melbourne Stars where she played the first two WBBL seasons.
 England marquee Sarah Glenn signed with the Scorchers, marking her first appearance in the WBBL.
New Zealand marquee Lauren Down was signed from the reserve player pool. She played five matches for the Scorchers from 1–11 November, replacing Amy Jones (quad injury).

The table below lists the Scorchers players and their key stats (including runs scored, batting strike rate, wickets taken, economy rate, catches and stumpings) for the season.

Ladder

Fixtures 
All times are local time

Regular season

Knockout phase

Statistics and awards 
 Most runs: Beth Mooney – 551 (1st in the league)
Highest score in an innings: Sophie Devine – 103 (68) vs Sydney Sixers, 8 November
Most wickets: Sarah Glenn – 17 (equal 6th in the league)
Best bowling figures in an innings: Sarah Glenn – 4/18 (4 overs) vs Adelaide Strikers, 22 November
Most catches: Sophie Devine – 7 (equal 6th in the league)
Player of the Match awards:
Sophie Devine – 5
Beth Mooney – 1
WBBL06 Player of the Tournament: Sophie Devine (1st)
WBBL06 Team of the Tournament: Sophie Devine, Beth Mooney, Taneale Peschel
Scorchers Most Valuable Player: Beth Mooney

References 

2020–21 Women's Big Bash League season by team
Perth Scorchers (WBBL)